Weldon "Weldy" Champness Young (October 4, 1871 – October 27, 1944) was a Canadian businessman and athlete. Young was an ice hockey player for the Ottawa Hockey Club, playing in its founding years in the 1880s and in the 1890s. Young later became a member of the Dawson City Nuggets which played against Ottawa in the 1905 Stanley Cup challenge. His brother George Young was one of the original Ottawa players and the two played together for Ottawa from 1889 to 1891. Young later became an investor and executive in mining in the Cobalt, Ontario area.

Playing career
Young first played for Ottawa HC in 1890 and played for the team until 1899. He moved out west, finding work in Dawson, Yukon Territory during the Gold Rush. He was recruited by the Dawson City team which challenged Ottawa in the 1905 season, although he was unable to participate due to his duties as a federal civil servant during a federal election at the time. He also found work as a referee in the Temiskaming League after retiring as a player. When the National Hockey Association (NHA) was holding merger talks with the Canadian Hockey Association, Young was the representative of the Haileybury club, although the club was owned by Ambrose O'Brien.

Mining career
After leaving Ottawa, Young joined the mining business in Dawson City, Yukon, Canada. By 1911, he was back east in Haileybury, Ontario during the "silver rush" in the area and he became an investor in several mines. Young later became the president of Young-Davidson mines, Weldon Coal Mines and vice-president of Matachewan-Hub Pioneer Mines Limited.

Young died at his home in Collingwood, Ontario on October 27, 1944. He was survived by his wife Jessie Williams. Young was buried in the Trinity United Church cemetery in Collingwood.

References

Notes

1871 births
1944 deaths
Ottawa Senators (original) players
Ice hockey people from Ottawa
Canadian ice hockey defencemen